Vesta is an unincorporated community in Oglethorpe County, in the U.S. state of Georgia.

History
A post office called Vesta was established in 1888, and remained in operation until 1904. The community was named after Vesta Johnson, the daughter of a local settler.

References

Unincorporated communities in Georgia (U.S. state)
Unincorporated communities in Oglethorpe County, Georgia